Beautiful Girl is a 2003 television movie starring Marissa Jaret Winokur. The film was directed by Douglas Barr for the ABC Family network.

Plot
Marissa Jaret Winokur plays Becca Wasserman, a young woman recently engaged to a young man, Adam Lopez (Mark Consuelos). Hoping to improve their modest honeymoon plans, Becca seeks the vacation prize offered in a local beauty pageant. Charming and buoyant, Becca enters herself confidently, over the objections of her embarrassed mother (Fran Drescher) who believes that her daughter's plus-size form will be ridiculed. Becca rejects the criticism and becomes determined to win.

Overcoming all expectations, Becca becomes Miss Squirrel Hill. The flush of success drives her to compete in other, larger pageants in the city, and she announces ambitious plans for the future. Her fiancé is supportive at first, but he becomes quickly dismayed by her aggressive efforts to win. As Becca struggles to advance in the pageant circuit, she appears to change for the worse in many ways, before finally recapturing her original good nature and joie de vivre.

Cast
Becca Wasserman – Marissa Jaret Winokur
Amanda Wasserman – Fran Drescher
Adam Lopez – Mark Consuelos
Rachel Wasserman – Sarah Manninen
 Libby Leslie – Reagan Pasternak
Supporting cast – Amanda Brugel; Barbara Radecki; Clare Stone; Charlotte Sullivan; Barbara Mamabolo; Brooke D'Orsay; Joyce Gordon; Stephanie Belding; Jordan Madley; Lesley Faulkner; Mark Leone

Production
The film is set in Pittsburgh but was filmed in Toronto.

References

External links

ABC Family original films
2003 television films
2003 films
Films set in Pittsburgh
Films about beauty pageants
Films shot in Toronto
2000s English-language films
Films directed by Douglas Barr